6/11 may refer to:

June 11 (month-day date notation)
November 6 (day-month date notation)
 The fraction equal to approximately 0.545454

See also

 11/6 (disambiguation)